Musée de la Faïence is a museum in Rarécourt in the Meuse department of France.

The museum is in a 17th-century house. It contains, among other things, 800 pieces of Argon earthenware and pottery.

References

See also
List of museums in France

Art museums and galleries in France
Museums in Meuse (department)